Chionosia apicalis is a moth of the subfamily Arctiinae first described by Zeller in 1874. It is found in Brazil and Trinidad.

References

Lithosiini